The men's 3 metre platform diving competition at the 2013 Southeast Asian Games took place in Naypyidaw, Myanmar on 19 December at the Wunna Theikdi Aquatics Centre.

Schedule
All times are Myanmar Standard Time (UTC+06:30)

Results 
Legend
DNF — Did not finish
DNS — Did not start

References 

Diving at the 2013 Southeast Asian Games